is a railway station in the town of Matsushima, Miyagi Prefecture, Japan, operated by East Japan Railway Company (JR East).

Lines
Rikuzen-Tomiyama Station is served by the Senseki Line, and is located 28.6 kilometers from the terminus of the Senseki Line at Aoba-dōri Station.

Station layout
The station has one side platform serving a single bi-directional track. The station is unattended.

History
The line was nationalized on May 1, 1944 and the station was renamed Rikuzen-Tomiyama at that time. The station was absorbed into the JR East network upon the privatization of JNR on April 1, 1987.

The station was closed from March 11, 2011 due to damage to the line associated with the 2011 Tōhoku earthquake and tsunami, and services replaced by a provisional bus rapid transit service. The station was reopened on 30 May 2015.

Surrounding area
Tomiyama Kannon

See also
 List of railway stations in Japan

References

External links

 

Railway stations in Miyagi Prefecture
Senseki Line
Railway stations in Japan opened in 1928
Stations of East Japan Railway Company
Matsushima, Miyagi